Nicolae Roman (born 15 September 1925, date of death unknown) was a Romanian footballer who played as a striker.

International career
Nicolae Roman played one friendly match for Romania, on 26 October 1952 when coach Gheorghe Popescu I sent him on the field in the 66th minute in order to replace Titus Ozon in a 3–1 victory against East Germany.

Honours
Steaua București
Divizia A: 1951
Locomotiva București
Divizia B: 1952

References

External links
 

1925 births
Year of death missing
Romanian footballers
Romania international footballers
Place of birth missing
Association football forwards
Liga I players
Liga II players
FC Universitatea Cluj players
FC Steaua București players
FC Rapid București players
Sportspeople from Sibiu